Dream Home Makeover is a 2020 reality television web series. The first season was released on Netflix on October 16, 2020, the second season on January 1, 2021, and the third season on July 27, 2022. The fourth season was released on December 9, 2022.

Premise 
Dream Home Makeover follows Shea and Syd McGee (of Studio McGee) as they help dreams come true for real families looking to update their home tailored to their own unique style. A typical episode has the couple working with a client on a renovation project in their home. The budget outlined by the clients range greatly, as some projects are just a single room while others are entire homes. Tying the episodic renovation storylines together, the show also acts as a documentary of the McGees; viewers get an intimate look into the McGees' personal life as they run Studio McGee, raise their three young daughters, and often make renovations on their own dream home.

Episodes

Season 1 (2020)

Season 2 (2021)

Season 3 (2022)

Season 4 (2022)

Release 
Dream Home Makeover was released on October 16, 2020, on Netflix.

References

External links
 
 

2020s American reality television series
2020 American television series debuts
English-language Netflix original programming
Makeover reality television series